Dweezil Zappa (born Ian Donald Calvin Euclid Zappa; September 5, 1969) is an American rock guitarist and occasional actor. He is the son of musical composer and performer Frank Zappa. Exposed to the music industry from an early age, Dweezil developed a strong affinity for playing the guitar and producing music. Able to learn directly from guitarists such as Steve Vai and Eddie Van Halen, Dweezil released his first single (produced by Eddie Van Halen) at the age of 12.

In addition to writing and recording his own music, Dweezil has carried on the legacy of his father's music by touring with the group Zappa Plays Zappa. The band features renditions of Zappa's original material and the lineup has often included Zappa alumni such as Napoleon Murphy Brock, Steve Vai, Terry Bozzio and others.

Early life
Dweezil Zappa was born on September 5, 1969, in Los Angeles, California to Frank Zappa and Gail Zappa. He is the second of four siblings: his older sister, Moon, younger sister Diva and younger brother Ahmet, and is the cousin of actress Lala Sloatman. Zappa's father was of Sicilian, Greek, Arab, and French descent, and his mother was of German and Portuguese ancestry.

Dweezil's registered birth name was Ian Donald Calvin Euclid Zappa. The nurse at the hospital at which he was born refused to register him under the name Dweezil, to the point of arguing with Gail in the delivery room about it. Rattled at this turn of events, Frank rapidly listed the names of several musician friends, and the nurse added all of them to the birth certificate.  At the age of five years, Dweezil learned that his legal name was different, and he insisted on having his nickname become his legal name. Gail and Frank hired an attorney and soon the name Dweezil was official.

Career
In the 1980s, Zappa worked as an MTV VJ and was promptly fired after badmouthing MTV on The Howard Stern Show (also, he had his father Frank Zappa co-hosting, who said that it would be okay for young Republicans to kill themselves after a Suicide PSA). He also recorded some solo albums, as well as playing for other artists. Zappa can be heard playing lead guitar on the Fat Boys' "Wipe Out" (1987) and can be seen in the music video for Don Johnson's top 40 song, "Heartbeat". He also played co-lead guitar (along with Reb Beach) on Winger's cover of Jimi Hendrix's "Purple Haze". He also had a part in the futuristic Arnold Schwarzenegger film The Running Man as Stevie ("Don't touch that dial!"), and gave his most famous cameo role in John Hughes's Brat Pack film, Pretty in Pink (starring Molly Ringwald), as Andie's friend, Simon.

Since the 1990s, Zappa has been working on a piece of music named "What the Hell Was I Thinking?", a 75-minute piece featuring guitar solos by dozens of famous guitar players. The project has suffered from numerous difficulties and has been reworked several times since the '90s. Dweezil said in September 2004: "I started recording it on analog tape almost 13 years ago... There are probably about 35 guest guitar players on it, everybody from Brian May to Eddie Van Halen, Eric Johnson, Angus and Malcolm Young—it's quite a crazy project. I'm still waiting and hoping to record Jeff Beck and Jimmy Page as some of my final guests on there."

For his 1991 album Confessions, Zappa recorded a cover of the Bee Gees' "Stayin' Alive" which featured vocals by Ozzy Osbourne. However, due to Osbourne's label refusing to allow the feature, the vocals were re-recorded by Donny Osmond, who was signed to the same label as Zappa. The version with Osbourne's vocals later appeared on Osbourne's box set Prince of Darkness.

In the mid-1990s, Zappa voiced the character Ajax Duckman on the animated series Duckman. He also briefly appeared in the television sitcom Normal Life with sister Moon Unit Zappa and former Laverne & Shirley star Cindy Williams. He composed and performed the theme music for The Ben Stiller Show (the solo from Spinal Tap's "Break Like the Wind"). In 1998, Zappa played music agent John Kaplan in the Warner Bros. family comedy Jack Frost. In 1999, Dweezil, alongside his brother, Ahmet Zappa, starred in a show featuring celebrities, bands and dance troupe called Happy Hour which debuted April 3, 1999 on the USA Network. The show lasted for one season despite its success due to a copyright dispute over the title of the show. To promote the show, him and Ahmet appeared briefly on the World Wrestling Federation's Rage Party, held the night prior to WrestleMania XV.

In "Weird Al" Yankovic's 2003 eleventh studio album Poodle Hat, Zappa performs the opening guitar solo and sings on the track, "Genius in France". In 2006, Zappa organized the "Zappa Plays Zappa" tour. He assembled a band of young musicians with a view to bring the music of Frank Zappa to a younger audience. The tour also featured guest appearances by Steve Vai, Napoleon Murphy Brock and Terry Bozzio. The tour began in Europe in May with dates in the U.S. from June. After a break it continued in the U.S. on October 18, 2006. The 2007 version of the tour ran from July, finishing in Australia in early December, and featured Ray White as special guest. The shows ended with the promise: "There are so many songs we want to learn to play ... see y'all next year...", and further tours have followed each year since 2007. In 2009, Ray White left Zappa Plays Zappa for an undisclosed reason.

Zappa lent his voice to one of the characters in one episode of Metalocalypse on Adult Swim.

In 2016, Zappa went on tour to celebrate the 50th anniversary of the release of Frank Zappa's album Freak Out!. The tour was titled "50 Years of Frank: Dweezil Zappa Plays Whatever the F@%k He Wants – The Cease and Desist Tour". The tour title was inspired by Zappa's feud with his brother Ahmet over the use of the "Zappa Plays Zappa" moniker, which resulted in Ahmet sending Zappa a cease-and-desist letter through the family trust.

Personal life

From 1998 to 2004, Zappa dated musician Lisa Loeb. Zappa and Loeb wrote and performed music together, and Zappa toured with Loeb's band. The couple co-hosted the cooking show Dweezil & Lisa on Food Network in 2004.

Zappa married fashion stylist Lauren Knudsen on September 3, 2005 in Los Angeles. They have two daughters: Zola Frank Zappa (born 2006) and Ceylon Indira Zappa (born 2008). In March 2010 Knudsen filed for divorce in L.A. County Superior Court. According to the documents, she applied to share legal custody of their two daughters. In March 2012, with the divorce case still unresolved, Zappa's former lawyer made a public issue of his unpaid legal bills.

Following the death of Zappa's mother, Gail, in October 2015, it was revealed that his siblings Ahmet and Diva were given control of the Zappa Family Trust with shares of 30% each, while Dweezil and his sister Moon were given smaller shares of 20% each. As beneficiaries only, Moon and Dweezil will not receive any distributions from the trust until it is profitable—in 2016, it was "millions of dollars in debt"—and must seek permission from Ahmet, the trustee, to make money off of their father's music or merchandise bearing his name. Dweezil received a cease-and-desist letter from the trust after he announced that he was being forced to perform his upcoming tour as "Dweezil Zappa Plays Frank Zappa" instead of using "Zappa Plays Zappa". In response to the trust's action, he renamed his performance series "50 Years of Frank: Dweezil Zappa Plays Whatever the F@%k He Wants—the Cease and Desist Tour".

In May 2018, the four siblings announced that they had reconciled.

Musical equipment

Guitars
Gibson SG – made of walnut, the main guitar on the F. O. H. album of Zappa Plays Zappa
Gibson Les Paul – 1958 reissue, wired like Jimmy Page's
Gibson Roxy SG – a replica of a guitar played by Frank Zappa on tour and in the studio during the '60s and '70s, the original Roxy SG can be seen depicted on the Roxy and Elsewhere album cover. Gibson produced a limited run of 400 Roxy SGs, featuring custom electronics and Maestro vibrola tail piece. Dweezil has used his own Roxy during Zappa Plays Zappa tours.
Fender Stratocaster

Amplifiers

 Fractal Audio Axe-FX 2
 Fractal Audio Axe-FX III

Discography

Solo
1982 – "My Mother Is a Space Cadet"/"Crunchy Water", 12" single
1986 – Havin' a Bad Day
1988 – My Guitar Wants to Kill Your Mama
1991 – Confessions
2000 – Automatic
2006 – Go with What You Know
2015 – Via Zammata'

With Ahmet Zappa
1994 – Shampoohorn
1996 – Music for Pets

With Zappa Plays Zappa
2008 – Zappa Plays Zappa
2010 – Return of the Son of...
2011 – In the Moment
2012 – F.O.H.
2012 – F.O.H. III: Out of Obscurity
2017 – Live In The Moment II

Guest appearances
1984 – Guitar solos "Sharleena" and "Stevie's Spanking" on Frank Zappa's Them or Us
1984 – Guitar on Frank Zappa's You Can't Do That on Stage Anymore, Vol. 3 (album) on "Sharleena"
1985 – Vocals on Frank Zappa's Frank Zappa Meets the Mothers of Prevention
1986 – Guitar solo on Don Johnson's song "The Last Sound Love Makes" and appearance in the video for "Heartbeat" 
1986 – Guitar solo on "Whipping Post" on Frank Zappa's Does Humor Belong in Music?
1988 – Winger on "Seventeen" and "Purple Haze"
1989 – With sister Moon Unit, contributed the track "(In Love) With You Gumby" to the novelty album Gumby
1990 – Opening and outro solos on Extreme's Pornograffitti on the song "He-Man Woman Hater"
1992 – Lead guitar on "Diva Fever" on Spinal Tap's Break Like the Wind
1993 – Lead guitar on "Dirty Love" and "Chunga's Revenge" on Zappa's Universe tribute
1994 – Barks on the track "Waffenspiel" on Frank Zappa's Civilization Phaze III
1994 – Co-lead guitar on "Chewing on Crayons"" on Blues Saraceno's Hairpick
1997 – Guitar solo on Pat Boone's cover of "Smoke on the Water" (the No More Mr. Nice Guy album)
1997 – Guitar on the song "Quando M'en Vo" from Giacomo Puccini, in the musical project "Angelica" 
2000 – Guitar on Dixie Dregs's California Screamin CD performing "Peaches en Regalia"
2001 – Guitar on Kip Winger's solo album Songs from the Ocean Floor
2001 – 9.11, on "Top of the World"
2003 – "Weird Al" Yankovic's Poodle Hat album, on "Genius in France"
2004 – Lead guitar on "Time Heals" on Todd Rundgren's "Hello, It's Me And My Friends"
2005 – Guitar on "Surf Punks" on the soundtrack to the game "Conker: Live & Reloaded"
2006 – Lead guitar on "Chunga's Revenge" and "Bavarian Sunset" on Frank Zappa's Trance-Fusion
2011 – Solo guitar on "Release the Memes" from Centrifugal Satz Clock: Morning, by Steve Kusaba
2011 – Electric guitar on "Gypsy Flee" from "A Kiss Before You Go" album By Norwegian band Katzenjammer
2013 – Solo guitar on "Mind Your Step" from Freak Guitar: The Smorgasbord, by Mattias IA Eklundh
2023 – Guitar on "Is My Dick Enough (feat. Dweezil Zappa)" by Steel Panther

References

External links
Dweezil Zappa's website

December 2010 interview  with Tom Waring
March 2016 interview with Marc Maron

1969 births
Living people
20th-century American guitarists
21st-century American guitarists
American heavy metal guitarists
American male television actors
American male voice actors
American people of Italian descent
American people of Arab descent
American people of Portuguese descent
American people of Greek descent
Lead guitarists
American people of Danish descent
American people of French descent
Lisa Loeb
Chrysalis Records artists
Grammy Award winners
American male guitarists
Zappa Plays Zappa members
Favored Nations artists
Zappa family